Emmanuel A. Gonzalez, Ph.D. is a Filipino educator and engineer. He became the Existing Installation Business Director at Jardine Schindler Elevator Corporation in 2015, a joint venture between Jardine Matheson and Schindler Group, until he moved to Holland, Ohio in the United States as the Reliability Manager for the Existing Installation Department of Schindler Elevator Corporation in 2017. He is a senior member of the Institute of Electrical and Electronics Engineers (IEEE) through the IEEE Toledo Section, a member of the Society of Maintenance and Reliability Professionals (SMRP), and an associate member of the National Research Council of the Philippines (NRCP) under the Department of Science and Technology (DOST). He is a recipient of the IEEE Education Distinguished Chapter Leadership Award in 2009 and the IEEE Education Society Student Leadership Award in 2010. Gonzalez currently serves as member-at-large for the IEEE Toledo Section,.

Education
Gonzalez received his B.S., M.S., and Ph.D. degrees all in Electronics and Communications Engineering at De La Salle University Manila. In 2007, he started studying Fractional calculus and its applications to circuit design and control engineering. He has published several papers together with colleagues in Philippines, Slovakia, Czech Republic, Estonia, and Spain until he completed his doctoral dissertation entitled "Design of Robust Fractional-Order Control Systems" under the supervision and guidance of Celso B. Co, Ph.D.

Publications (selected)
E. A. Gonzalez, I. Petras, and M. D. Ortigueira, "Novel polarization index evaluation formula and fractional-order dynamics in electric motor insulation resistance," Fractional Calculus & Applied Analysis, vol. 21, no. 3, 2018, pp. 613–627.
A. Tepljakov, E. Petlenkov, E. A. Gonzalez, J. Belikov, "Digital realization of retuning fractional-order controllers for an existing closed-loop control system," Journal of Circuits, Systems and Computers, vol. 26, no. 10, Oct. 2017.
E. A. Gonzalez, A. Tepljakov, C. A. Monje, and I. Petras, "Retrofitting fractional-order dynamics to an existing feedback control system: from classical proportional-integral (PI) control to fractional-order proportional-derivative (FOPD) control," International Research Journal on Innovations in Engineering, Science and Technology, vol. 3, no. 1., 2017.
E. A. Gonzalez, I. Petras, M. J. B. Castro, R. S. Presto, and M. Radi, "Fractional-order models in motor polarization index measurements", The 17th International Carpathian Control Conference, High Tatras, Tatranska Lomnica, Grandhotel Praha, Slovakia, May 29-Jun. 1, 2016.

Publications of Gonzalez can be found in Google Scholar and ResearchGate.

References

1982 births
Living people
Engineering academics
Filipino engineers
Electronics engineers
21st-century Filipino scientists
De La Salle University alumni
People from Holland, Ohio